Maiestas angustisecta is a species of bug from the Cicadellidae family that can be found in Liberia and Congo. Two species from genus Recilia, R. dolabra and R. jordanica were found to be junior synonyms of M. angustisecta in a 2009 revision of Recilia.

References

Insects described in 1962
Insects of Africa
Maiestas